Shamila Shirzad (born 2006) is an Iranian actress. She rose to prominence for her performance as Zahra in the 2020 acclaimed drama film Sun Children which was shortlisted at the 93rd Academy Awards for Best Foreign Language Film.

Early life 
Shamila Shirzad was born in 2006 as the first child of an Afghan family from the Hazara ethnic group in Tehran, she has only one younger brother Abulfazl Shirzad, and her parents are immigrants from Kabul to Tehran.

Filmography 
Sun Children (2020)
In 2020, when she was 13 years old, Shamila Shirzad acted with her brother Abulfazl Shirzad in the movie Sun Children, directed by Majid Majidi, alongside Javad Ezzati and Tanaz Tabatabai. This film was recognized as the best film of the Fajr International Film Festival.

See also 
 Sun Children
 Afghanistanis in Iran

References

External links 
 

Hazara people
Hazara artists
Iranian people of Afghan descent
People from Tehran
Living people
2006 births